Razzle Dazzle is the seventeenth album by Japanese rock band Buck-Tick, released on October 13, 2010. Graphic artist Aquirax Uno provided the illustrations for the album's cover. The limited edition came with a DVD of music videos and an interview. It reached number six on both the Oricon chart and Billboard Japan, selling 20,384 copies.

With Razzle Dazzle, Buck-Tick wanted to go beyond the straight rock "band sound" from their previous two albums. Incorporating elements of dance music, its title was taken from a song in the 2002 American musical film Chicago.

"Dokudanjō Beauty" was used as the second ending theme song for the Japanese airing of Battlestar Galactica. This album version features Lucy, vocalist of the all-female rock band LAZYgunsBRISKY, singing the chorus. The single version of "Kuchizuke" was used as the opening theme for the Shiki anime. The anime also used "Gekka Reijin", as its second ending song.

Track listing

Personnel 
Buck-Tick
 Atsushi Sakurai – vocals
 Hisashi Imai – guitar, electronics, chorus
 Hidehiko Hoshino – electric guitar, acoustic guitar, chorus
 Yutaka Higuchi – bass
 Toll Yagami – drums

Additional performers
 Kazutoshi Yokoyama – manipulator, synthesizer on tracks 1–3, 5 & 7–9
 Cube Juice – programming, synthesizer on tracks 4, 6 & 11
 Lucy (LAZYgunsBRISKY) – chorus on track 4

References 

Buck-Tick albums
2010 albums
Japanese-language albums